Specklinia ciliifera is a species of orchid plant native to the Dominican Republic.

References 

ciliifera
Flora of the Dominican Republic
Flora without expected TNC conservation status